Francis Harvey (1873–1916) was an officer of the British Royal Marine Light Infantry during the First World War.

Francis Harvey or Frank Harvey may also refer to:
 Francis Harvey (MP for Colchester) (1534–1602), English politician, MP for Colchester, Knaresborough and Chippenham
 Francis Harvey (died 1632), MP for Aldeburgh
 Francis Harvey (MP for Northampton) (1611–1703), English lawyer and politician
 Frank Harvey (cricketer) (1864–1939), English sportsman
 Frank Harvey (playwright) (1842–1903), English father of Australian screenwriter
 Frank Harvey (Australian screenwriter) (1885–1965), English-born actor, producer and writer
 Frank Harvey (English screenwriter) (1912–1981), award-winning son of the above screenwriter
 Francis Harvey (poet) (1925–2014), Northern Irish poet and playwright
 Frank Harvey (priest) (1930–1986), Anglican Archdeacon of London
 Francis J. Harvey (born 1943), Secretary of the United States Army